Maksud Karimov (born 2 March 1985) is an Uzbek footballer. He currently plays as defender for Nasaf Qarshi.

Career
Since 2010 he has played for Nasaf Qarshi. Karimov is one of the leading players of the club. In 2011, he won AFC Cup with Nasaf.

International
He has played 3 matches for Uzbekistan, beginning with a 2010 friendly match against Armenia.

Honors
 Uzbek League runner-up (1): 2011
 Uzbek Cup runner-up (2): 2011, 2012
 AFC Cup winner (1): 2011

Career statistics

Club
Statistics accurate as of 14 March  2013

References

External links
 
 
 

1985 births
Living people
Uzbekistani footballers
FC Nasaf players
Association football defenders
Uzbekistan Super League players
AFC Cup winning players
Uzbekistan international footballers